Reginald Sutherland Bundy (26 May 1946 – 15 April 2003) was a British dancer, actor and television presenter best known for his drag persona H.I.H. (Her Imperial Highness) Regina Fong.

Bundy first developed Regina Fong in 1985, and quickly achieved a regular spot at the Black Cap gay pub in Camden Town, London and also the Royal Vauxhall Tavern. The Fong character was a Russian princess who had escaped to Britain following the Russian Revolution, a conceit which formed the basis of Bundy's show The Last of the Romanoffs, which premiered at the Edinburgh Festival and later ran at the Bloomsbury Theatre in London.

Regina's stage act entailed audience participation, and used a variety of songs, jingles, and sound effects. She was one of the regular hosts of London's Lesbian and Gay Pride Festival.

Bundy appeared in the Edinburgh and London productions of playwright Neil Bartlett's A Vision of Love Revealed in Sleep and Night After Night, and also appeared in the BBC Radio Four adaptation of Night After Night.

Regina Fong also appeared in the London production of Angels, Punks and Raging Queens in 1995.

Bundy died from cancer on 15 April 2003, aged 56.

See also

List of drag queens

External links
Regina Fong information at The Black Cap website

Notes

1941 births
2003 deaths
English drag queens
Entertainers from London
LGBT dancers
20th-century English LGBT people